Guotai  is a pinyin transliteration of a Chinese given name; in Cantonese dialect, it may also transliteration as Kwok Tai; in Singapore and Malaysia, as Kok Thay, may refer to:
 Zhou Guotai, a Chinese military general
 Law Kwok-tai, Republic of China (Taiwan) international footballer from Hong Kong in the 1950s to 1960s
 Lim Kok Thay, Malaysian billionaire

See also
 Guotai (disambiguation)